Henry Aldous Dixon (June 29, 1890 – January 22, 1967) was a U.S. Representative from Utah and the president of first Weber College and later Utah State Agricultural College.

Biography
Born in Provo in the Utah Territory, Dixon attended the public schools until high school, when he attended private Brigham Young High School, from which he graduated in 1909. He graduated from Brigham Young University, Provo, Utah, in 1914, from the University of Chicago in 1917, and from the University of Southern California in 1937.

Career
Dixon was an instructor at Weber College, which later became Weber State University, from 1914 to 1918, and served as the college's president twice, in 1919–1920 and 1937–1953. Between these presidential terms, he served as superintendent of Provo city schools from 1920–1924 and again in 1932-1937. Between these two terms as superintendent, from 1924 to 1932, Dixon was managing vice president of Farmers and Merchants Bank. During his second term as president of Weber College, he was a member of the President's Commission on Higher Education (1946–1948), a member of the board of directors of Salt Lake Branch of the Federal Reserve Bank of San Francisco (1945–1951), and director of the Association of Junior Colleges (1950–1954).

After heading Weber College, he became president of Utah State Agricultural College (which later became Utah State University) at Logan, Utah from August 1953 to December 1954.

In 1954, Republican 1st District Congressman Douglas Stringfellow was forced to retire from Congress after only one term after it emerged he had lied about both his service record in World War II and his educational history.  Dixon was asked to replace Stringfellow on the ballot only 16 days before the election and won.  He served in the Eighty-fourth, Eighty-fifth, and Eighty-sixth Congresses (January 3, 1955 – January 3, 1961). He did not seek renomination in 1960. Dixon voted in favor of the Civil Rights Acts of 1957 and 1960.

Later activities
Dixon taught at Brigham Young University, his alma mater, until 1965.

He died in Ogden, Utah, January 22, 1967 and was interred in Washington Heights Memorial Park.

References

Sources

External links
 

1890 births
1967 deaths
20th-century American politicians
School superintendents in Utah
Brigham Young University alumni
Brigham Young University faculty
Educators from Utah
Latter Day Saints from Utah
Politicians from Provo, Utah
Presidents of Utah State University
Republican Party members of the United States House of Representatives from Utah
University of Chicago alumni
University of Southern California alumni
Weber State University faculty
Brigham Young High School alumni